Saurauia microphylla is a species of plant in the Actinidiaceae family. It is endemic to Java in Indonesia.

References

microphylla
Endemic flora of Java
Vulnerable plants
Taxonomy articles created by Polbot
Taxa named by Willem Hendrik de Vriese
Plants described in 1856